Hiiu Parish was a rural municipality of Hiiu County, Estonia. It occupied the northwestern part of the Hiiumaa island. The population was about 5000 (as of 26 June 2013), about 3600 of whom lived in the parish seat.

Hiiu Parish was established by merging the town of Kärdla (former urban municipality) and Kõrgessaare Parish after the municipal elections held on 20 October 2013. Kärdla was non-contiguous with the rest of the municipality.

Populated places
Hiiu Parish had a town Kärdla, a small borough (alevik) Kõrgessaare and 58 villages: Heigi, Heiste, Heistesoo, Hirmuste, Hüti, Isabella, Jõeranna, Jõesuu, Kalana, Kaleste, Kanapeeksi, Kauste, Kidaste, Kiduspe, Kiivera, Kodeste, Koidma, Kopa, Kõpu, Kurisu, Laasi, Lauka, Lehtma, Leigri, Lilbi, Luidja, Mägipe, Malvaste, Mangu, Mardihansu, Meelste, Metsaküla, Mudaste, Napi, Nõmme, Ogandi, Ojaküla, Otste, Palli, Paope, Pihla, Poama, Puski, Reigi, Risti, Rootsi, Sigala, Sülluste, Suurepsi, Suureranna, Tahkuna, Tammistu, Tiharu, Ülendi, Viita, Viitasoo, Vilima, Villamaa.

Gallery

See also
Kõpu Lighthouse

References

External links

  

Former municipalities of Estonia